
Saghamo Lake is a lake of Samtskhe-Javakheti, southeastern Georgia, just south of Gamdzani. It covers an area of 458 hectares. It is located north of Madatapa Lake and Biketi Lake. The village of Saghamo lies on its eastern bank.

References

Lakes of Georgia (country)
Geography of Samtskhe–Javakheti